Andrewsi may refer to:

 Bufo andrewsi, a toad species found in China
 Bunomys andrewsi, a rodent species
 Christmas frigatebird or Christmas Island frigatebird (Fregata andrewsi), a frigatebird endemic to the Christmas Islands
 Metridiochoerus andrewsi, an extinct pig species indigenous to the Pliocene and Pleistocene of Africa
 Moeritherium andrewsi, an extinct mammal species that lived during the Eocene epoch

See also
Andrews (disambiguation)
Andrews (surname)
Andrewi (disambiguation)